Gregory Carl Cook is an American lawyer from Alabama who serves as an associate justice of the Supreme Court of Alabama since 2023.

Education 

Cook received a Bachelor of Arts from Duke University, summa cum laude in 1984, while attending on an ROTC scholarship, and a Juris Doctor from Harvard Law School, magna cum laude, in 1991 where he was an editor on the Harvard Journal of Law and Public Policy.

Career 

After graduating law school, Cook moved back to Birmingham to practice law. He is also a United States Air Force veteran, reaching the rank of Captain. Cook was a partner with the law firm Balch & Bingham for 30 years. In 2000, Cook served as a volunteer attorney for the Bush v. Gore legal battle in Florida, where he supervised the hand recounting of hanging-chad ballots.

Political involvement 

Cook served on the Jefferson County Republican Steering Committee, Executive Committee, and as legal counsel to the Jefferson County GOP. For 15 years, Cook served with the Alabama Republican Party, including four years as general counsel.

Alabama Supreme Court 

In 2021, Cook announced his candidacy for the Republican nomination to a seat on the Supreme Court of Alabama. Cook ran to replace retiring Justice Michael F. Bolin and faced Circuit Judge Debra Jones in the primary. Cook went on to win the primary with 54.3% of the vote. Cook then won the November 8, 2022, general election, receiving 67.4% of the vote. Cook's investiture ceremony, where he took his oath of office, was held on January 13, 2023. Cook formally took office on January 17, 2023.

Personal life 

Cook has been married to his wife Kimberly B. Cook since 1988. They have three children. He has been a member of Dawson Baptist Church since 1991, where he is an ordained deacon.

Election Results

References

External links 
Alabama Judicial System biography

Living people
Place of birth missing (living people)
Year of birth missing (living people)
20th-century American lawyers
21st-century American lawyers
Alabama lawyers
Alabama Republicans
Baptists from Alabama
Duke University alumni
Federalist Society members
Harvard Law School alumni
United States Air Force officers